Kundur may refer to:
 Kundur, Afghanistan, a village in Herat Province which is primarily Mogholi speaking
 Kundur, Iran, a village in East Azerbaijan Province, Iran
 Kundur, Russia, a rural locality in Amur Oblast, Russia
 Kundur Island, an island in Indonesia, in the Riau Archipelago, and part of the Riau Islands Province
 Kündür, an official in the Khazar government
 Deepa Kundur, Canadian engineer